The 2011–12 Charleston Southern Buccaneers men's basketball team represented Charleston Southern University during the 2011–12 NCAA Division I men's basketball season. The Buccaneers, led by seventh year head coach Barclay Radebaugh, played their home games at CSU Field House and are members of the Big South Conference. They finished the season 19–12, 11–7 in Big South play to finish in a tie for third place. They lost in the semifinals of the Big South Basketball tournament to UNC Asheville. Despite having 19 wins, they did not accept an invitation to a post season tournament.

Roster

Schedule

|-
!colspan=9| Regular season

|-
!colspan=9| 2012 Big South Conference men's basketball tournament

References

Charleston Southern Buccaneers men's basketball seasons
Charleston Southern
Charleston Southern Buccaneers men's basketball
Charleston Southern Buccaneers men's basketball